Constellation Prize is the ninth studio album by the band Carbon Leaf and was released on their own label, Constant Ivy Music.

Track listing

References

2013 albums
Carbon Leaf albums